Al Wafa is an Islamic charity listed in Executive Order 13224 as an entity that supports terrorism.
United States intelligence officials state that it was founded in Afghanistan by Adil Zamil Abdull Mohssin Al Zamil,
Abdul Aziz al-Matrafi and Samar Khand. Affiliated groups include The Taliban and Al Qaeda.

According to Saad Madai Saad al-Azmi's Combatant Status Review Tribunal Al Wafa is located in the Wazir Akhbar Khan area of
Afghanistan. Al Wafa al Igatha al Islamia, also known with other names like as Wafa Humanitarian Organization, Al Wafa, Al Wafa Organization is an active group.

Individuals alleged to have affiliation with Al Wafa

See also
 List of charities accused of ties to terrorism
 Wafa al Bass

References

Islamic charities
Organizations based in Asia designated as terrorist